The 2020–21 season is Brescia Leonessa's 12th in existence and the club's 6th consecutive season in the top tier Italian basketball.

Overview

Kit 
Supplier: Errea / Sponsor: Germani

Players

Current roster

Depth chart

Squad changes

In

|}

Out

|}

Confirmed 

|}

Coach

Competitions

Supercup

Serie A

Eurocup

Regular season

See also 

 2020–21 LBA season
 2020–21 EuroCup Basketball
 2020 Italian Basketball Supercup

References 

Brescia
Brescia